The 49th Guards Rifle Division was an infantry division of the Red Army. The division was formed in October 1942 from the 2nd Guards Motor Rifle Division.

Formation 
The 49th Guards Rifle Division was formed in the Western Front reserves near Moscow on 13 October 1942 from the remains of the 2nd Guards Motor Rifle Division. The unit was immediately assigned to the newly formed 13th Guards Rifle Corps in the 2nd Guards Army. They were sent south to the Stalingrad area in December 1942 and went into action south of Stalingrad.
When formed, its order of battle was as follows:
 144th Guards Rifle Regiment
 147th Guards Rifle Regiment
 149th Guards Rifle Regiment
 100th Guards Artillery Regiment
 56th Guards Separate Anti-tank Battalion
 64th Guards Anti-Aircraft Battery (up to 25 April 1943)
 1st Guards Machine Gun Battalion (up to 1 June 1943)
 51st Guards Reconnaissance Company
 57th Guards Separate Sapper Battalion
 77th Guards Separate Signals Battalion
 561st (53rd) Medical and Sanitation Battalion
 52nd Guards Separate Chemical Defense Company
 609th (53rd) Auto-Transport Company
 638th (48th) Field Bakery
 641st (50th) Divisional Veterinary Hospital
 572nd Field Postal Station
 44th Field Office of State Bank

Later the division helped liberate Kherson (the name "Khersonskaya" was conferred on the division). It took part in the liberation of Romania and Hungary.

The division ended the war in Austria. By this time the division had the following honorifics: Khersonskaya, Order of the Red Banner, Order of Suvorov 2nd Class.

Postwar
After the end of the war the division became a part of the Southern Group of Forces, being reorganised as the 33rd Guards Mechanised Division. In September 1949 the 33rd Guards Mechanized Division arrived in Timișoara from the Odessa Military District, becoming part of the Special Mechanized Army. The 33rd Guards Mechanized Division was detached to the Special Corps and fought in Operation Whirlwind, the suppression of the Hungarian Revolution of 1956. After the end of the operation, the division became part of the newly reformed Southern Group of Forces. On 4 June 1957, the division became the 33rd Guards Motor Rifle Division. The division was based at Győr with the 38th Army. In 1958 it moved to Kishinev and became part of the 14th Army. The division was disbanded there on 8 October 1960.

Commanders

69th Rifle Division 
 Colonel Athanasius Dmitrievich Shemenkov (June 1938 - December 1940)

107th Tank Division 
 Colonel Piotr Nikolaevich Domrachev (18 July 1941 - 30 August 1941)
 Colonel Porfiry Chanchibadze (31 August 1941 - 15 September 1941)

107th Motorized Rifle Division 
 Colonel  Porfiry Chanchibadze (16 September 1941 - 12 January 1942)

2nd Guards Motorized Rifle Division 
 Colonel Porfiry Chanchibadze (12 January 1942 - 24 October 1942)

49th Guards Rifle Division 
 Major General Porfiry Chanchibadze (25 October – 14 November 1942)
 Colonel Denis Podshivailov - (15 November 1942 – 11 April 1943; promoted to major general 27 November 1942)
 Colonel Georgy Kolesnikov - (12 April – 14 November 1943)
 Lieutenant Colonel Lev Puzanov (1 December 1943 – 10 January 1944)
 Colonel Vasily Margelov (11 January – 15 May 1944)
 Colonel Stepan Salychev  (16 May – 21 June 1944)
 Colonel Vasily Margelov (22 June 1944 – 11 May 1945; promoted to major general 13 September 1944)

References

Sources
 
 

G049
Military units and formations established in 1942
Military units and formations disestablished in 1946
Military units and formations awarded the Order of the Red Banner